Yemen is an Arab country in Western Asia at the southern end of the Arabian Peninsula. As of 2013, the country had a GDP (ppp) of US$61.63 billion, with an income per capita of $2,500. Services are the largest economic sector (61.4% of GDP), followed by the industrial sector (30.9%), and agriculture (7.7%). Of these, petroleum production represents around 25% of GDP and 63% of the government's revenue.

Yemen's industrial sector is centered on crude oil production and petroleum refining, food processing, handicrafts, small-scale production of cotton textiles and leather goods, aluminum products, commercial ship repair, cement, and natural gas production. As of  2013, Yemen had an industrial production growth rate of 4.8%. It also has large proven reserves of natural gas. Yemen's first liquified natural gas plant began production in October 2009.

Notable firms 
This list includes notable companies with primary headquarters located in the country. The industry and sector follow the Industry Classification Benchmark taxonomy. Organizations which have ceased operations are included and noted as defunct.

See also
 Economy of Yemen

References

Yemen